The Renaissance Man is an audio drama based on the long-running British science fiction television series Doctor Who. This audio drama was produced by Big Finish Productions as part of their Fourth Doctor Adventures.

Plot
The Doctor endeavours to educate Leela by taking her to the greatest collection of Earth artifacts in the universe, The Morovanian Museum on Morovania Minor. But instead, they find themselves in a strange English village, inhabited by a variety of academics, and presided over by a curious collector called Harcourt.

Cast
The Doctor – Tom Baker
Leela – Louise Jameson
Harcourt – Ian McNeice
Jephson – Gareth Armstrong
Edward – Anthony Howell
Lizzie – Daisy Ashford
Beryl / Professor Hilda Lutterthwaite – Laura Molyneux
Dr Henry Carnforth – John Dorney

Notes
Ian McNeice played Winston Churchill in the series 5 episode "Victory of the Daleks" and the series 6 episode "The Wedding of River Song".
Gareth Armstrong previously appeared with Tom Baker's Doctor in the 1976 story, The Masque of Mandragora.
Daisy Ashford is the daughter of Geoffrey Beevers and Caroline John, who played the Master and Liz Shaw, respectively.

References

External links
The Renaissance Man at the Big Finish Website

Fourth Doctor audio plays